Coleophora trochilella is a moth of the family Coleophoridae. It is found in all of Europe, with possible exception of parts of the Balkan Peninsula.

The wingspan is 11–14 mm. Adults are on wing from June to July.

The larvae feed on Asteraceae species (Achillea, Artemisia vulgaris, Eupatorium, Tanacetum). They create a straw-coloured, slender, three-valved tubular case with a length of about 10 mm. The mouth angle is 45°-60°. The larvae are found at the leaf underside. Cases have been recorded from August to June of the following year.

External links
 
 Plant Parasites of Europe
 Lepiforum.de
 UK Moths

trochilella
Moths described in 1843
Moths of Europe
Taxa named by Philogène Auguste Joseph Duponchel